The wrestling competition at the 2010 Summer Youth Olympics took place in Singapore from 15 to 17 August at the International Convention Centre. The first positive drugs tests of the Games came in wrestling events, with the International Olympic Committee announcing on 15 October that two wrestlers, including a silver medallist, had tested positive for furosemide.

Event summary

Medal table

Girl's events

Freestyle

Boy's events

Freestyle

Greco-Roman

Changes in medal winners
On 15 October 2010, the International Olympic Committee announced that Nurbek Hakkulov, who won a silver medal for Uzbekistan in wrestling, and Johnny Pilay who finished fifth in a separate wrestling event for Ecuador, had tested positive for a banned diuretic, furosemide. Both were disqualified and Hakkulov was stripped of his silver medal, although no decision was taken on whether to promote Shadybek Sulaimanov and Johan Rodriguez Banguela in the event.

References

 
2010 Summer Youth Olympics events
2010 in sport wrestling
2010
Wrestling in Singapore